Below is the list of all small towns and villages of Dhule district in Maharashtra, central India, organized by administrative

Dhule Taluka

Sakri Taluka

Sindkhede Taluka

Shirpur Taluka

See also 
 Dhule City
 Dhule District
 List of districts of Maharashtra
 Maharashtra

Villages in Dhule district
Dhule